Daniel Wright or Dan Wright may refer to:

 Dan S. Wright (1802–1867), physician and politician, New York, U.S.
 Daniel B. Wright (1812–1887), U.S. Representative from Mississippi
 Daniel Thew Wright (1864–1943), U.S. federal judge
 Daniel Thew Wright Sr. (1825–1912), 1876 member of the Ohio Supreme Court Commission, U.S. 
 Dan Wright (musician) (born c. 1947), keyboard player for the band Proto-Kaw
 Dan Wright (baseball) (born 1977), American baseball pitcher
 Daniel Wright (baseball) (born 1991), American baseball pitcher
 Dan Wright (comedian) (born 1979), English comedian
 Daniel Wright (footballer) (born 1984), British footballer

See also
 Daniel Wright Junior High School, Lake County, Illinois, U.S.
 Danny Wright (disambiguation)
 Daniel Wight (disambiguation)